Norderstedt Mitte station is a railway station in Norderstedt, Germany. It is a terminus for the rapid transit trains of the line U1 of the Hamburg U-Bahn and connects the underground railway with the commuter trains of the AKN railway company line A2 (Alster Northern Railway).

Station layout 
The terminus of the U1 is an island platform with the bay platform for changing to the commuter trains of the A2. The platform is partly underground and partly open sub level. There are stairs and escalators to the bus station, and, with a lift and special floor design the station is fully accessible for handicapped people in a wheelchair or blind persons. There is no station personal but ticket machines, CCTV, and an emergency call and information telephone.

Services 
The U1 underground trains run every 10 minutes, 5 minutes at rush hours, night service is every 20 minutes from 23:00 to midnight, arriving trains until 01:15. There is an all night service on Friday and Saturday nights every 20 minutes.

The A2 commuter trains run on weekdays every 20 minutes, 10 minutes at rush hours, night service is every 40 minutes from 23:00 to 01:00. Sundays there is a 40 minutes service all day from 06:00 to 01:00.

See also 
 Hamburger Verkehrsverbund Public transport association in Hamburg
 Hamburger Hochbahn Operator of the Hamburg U-Bahn

References

External links 
 Network plan HVV (pdf) 560 KiB 

Hamburg U-Bahn stations in Schleswig-Holstein
Buildings and structures in Segeberg
U1 (Hamburg U-Bahn) stations
Railway stations in Germany opened in 1996
Railway stations in Germany opened in 1953
1953 establishments in West Germany